Colin Austin (born 1940) is an Australian award-winning researcher, engineer, and inventor of Autodesk product Moldflow Plastics design software.

Biography
Colin graduated  from  Sheffield University in 1963. He worked as an R & D Manager for Johns Hydraulics then worked as lecturer for RMIT University in Melbourne, Australia.

In 1978 Colin Austin founded company Moldflow (currently a subsidiary of Autodesk) devoted to simulation of injection molding. Colin developed Moldflow Plastics design software that transformed the international design of plastics moulds using scientific principles rather than 'gut feel'. After many years he became the most successful exporters of technical software in Australia, and more than 48 countries in the world used his software.

In 1997 Colin Austin founded a company named Waterright devoted to simulation of irrigation and producing soil sensors and software to fix common irrigation problems.

Award
He received numerous awards, including:
1980: John Derham Award for Technical Innovation
1982: National Small Business Award
1983: Governor of Victoria, Export Award
1984: Governor of Victoria, Export Award
1984: Dept of Trade in Association with Confederation of Australian Industry's Export Award for outstanding achievement.
1993: AITA Exporter of the year award
1997: Fred O.Conley Award for outstanding achievement in plastics engineering &technology
2002: Triannual Plastics Industry Award for contributions to the plastics industry
2002: SPE Environmental Award
2002: SaveWater award winner agricultural section
2003: SaveWater award Regional Sustainability

Books

References

1940 births
Living people
Australian engineers
Australian chairpersons of corporations